Nasi Lemak 1.0 (Chinese: 辣死你妈传人) is a 2022 Malaysian comedy film by Namewee. A sequel to 2011 film Nasi Lemak 2.0, it tells the story of Chef Huang who accidentally travels back in time to the glorious Malacca Kingdom 600 years ago, where he caught up between the battle of pirates.

It is released on 27 January 2022 in Malaysia and Singapore. It is one of the five 2022 Malaysian and Singaporean Chinese New Year films, including Kongsi Raya and Small Town Heroes (Malaysia), Ah Girls Go Army and Reunion Dinner (Singapore).

Synopsis
After the events of Nasi Lemak 2.0, Chef Huang's restaurant is having another slump in business, due to being too slow to serve food. A new restaurant is opened by his all-time nemesis Lan Qiao across the street. Chef Huang challenges him and once again hold a cooking competition to see who makes the best Nasi Lemak. During the intense competition, an explosion accident causes Chef Huang and the others to travel back in time and find themselves in the Malacca Sultanate 600 years ago, where nasi lemak is still not available and pirates are rampant, while the fleet of Cheng Ho is approaching. Caught in between the historical conflicts that will happen, now they must embark on the journey, how will their story go?

Cast 

 Namewee
 Karen Kong
 AC Mizal
 Yumi Wong
 Saiful Apek
 Delimawati
 Wak Doyok
 Sanjna Suri
 Yassin Yahya
 Vikar
 David Arumugam
 Dennis Lau

Release 
The film is written and directed by Namewee. It is the sequel to the 2011 Malaysian film Nasi Lemak 2.0 after 11 years. Filming is completed in 2019. Almost all the multiethnic cast of Nasi Lemak 2.0 return and reprise their roles, and there are several new additions to the cast.

Reception

Box-office
The film emerged as the top non-Hollywood film in Malaysia over the Chinese New Year period, taking an estimated RM 2.4 million at the local box office since its opening on January 27.

Critical response
The film receives mixed to negative reviews.

References

External links 

2022 films
Malaysian comedy films